The 2015 Campeonato Rondoniense de Futebol was the 25th edition of Rondônia's top professional football league. The competition began on 5 April and ended on 4 July. Genus won the championship by the first time.

Format
The five teams face off in two rounds. In the first round the teams face each other and the top two make the final. The champion ensures spot in the 2015 Campeonato Brasileiro Série D. In the second round, the champion guaranteed spot in the 2016 Copa Verde.

After the two phases, the final of the competition with the champions of the two rounds if facing two games will be held. If the winner of the 1st and 2nd rounds is the same, it will be the league champion. The champion of the competition is up to berth in the 2016 Copa do Brasil.

First round

Final

First leg

Second leg

Second round

Final

First leg

Second leg

Finals

First leg

Second leg

References

Rondonia